The Krayenberg  is a  hill near Tiefenort, Germany. Since 500 BCE it was a rampart and served as a refuge 
for the central part of the Werratal. It became important for German history due to the Krayenburg, which was built on its top after 786, and destroyed starting with the Thirty Years' War. Today, the well-maintained ruins, a restaurant and a hotel define a tourist location in the Werratal.

External links
 History of Krayenberg and Krayenburg 

Hills of Thuringia
Landmarks in Germany